Ziemeri Manor is a manor house in Ziemeri Parish, Alūksne Municipality in the Vidzeme region of Latvia.

History 
Ziemeri manor was first mentioned in 1550, when property owner Johans Felbergs sold manor to his brother-in-law, Albreht Seimer, for 100 thalers. Over the centuries a large number of changes of ownership have occurred. 
Current Manor house was built between 1786 and 1807 in Classical style.
Nowadays manor offers guests the opportunity to experience other historical times, trying on clothes in the manor salon and enjoying a dessert prepared according to an old recipes in the manor cafe “4 Rozes un Vilks”.

See also
List of palaces and manor houses in Latvia

References

External links
  Ziemeri Manor

Manor houses in Latvia
Alūksne Municipality
Vidzeme